is a former Japanese football player and manager and currently academy manager for Gamba Osaka.

Playing career
Matsunami was born in Gifu on November 21, 1974. After graduating from high school, he joined Gamba Osaka in 1993. he played as regular player from first season. On 20 November, he became the youngest player to score a hat-trick in J1 League at age 18 years, 364 days. In 1997, he played with Patrick M'Boma and he played all 32 matches and scored 13 goals. M'Boma also scored 25 goals and became a top scorer. In 2000s, although he played as substitutes behind young player Hiromi Kojima, Kota Yoshihara and so on, he played many matches. In 2005, the club won the champions J1 League first league champions in club history. The club also won the 2nd place 2005 J.League Cup. He retired end of 2005 season.

Coaching career
After retirement, Matsunami started coaching career at Gamba Osaka in 2006. He mainly coached for youth team until 2009. In 2010, he became a coach for top team under manager Akira Nishino. In 2012, José Carlos Serrão became new manager as Nishino successor. However the club results were bad and Serrão was sacked in March. Matsunami named new manager as Serrão successor. However the club was relegated to J2 League end of season. Although the club won the 2nd place Emperor's Cup, he resigned end of 2012 season. In 2014, he moved to newly was relegated to J3 League club, Gainare Tottori. Although he managed in 2 seasons, the club could not return to J2 and he resigned end of 2015 season.

Club statistics

Managerial statistics

References

External links
 
 
 
 

1974 births
Living people
Association football people from Gifu Prefecture
Japanese footballers
J1 League players
Gamba Osaka players
Japanese football managers
J1 League managers
J3 League managers
Gamba Osaka managers
Gainare Tottori managers
Association football forwards